Susan E. Gillingham (born 1951) is a British theologian, academic, and Anglican deacon. She specialises in the Hebrew Bible, the Psalms, and Jewish history from the Israelites to the Second Temple. She has been Fellow and Tutor in theology at Worcester College, Oxford since 1995, and was Professor of the Hebrew Bible at the University of Oxford from 2014 to 2019. She is the first British woman to have been awarded a Doctor of Divinity (DD) degree by the University of Oxford.

Early life and education
Gillingham was born in 1951. She studied theology at St John's College, Nottingham, an Anglican theological college, where she was its first female student. The college's degree are validated by the University of Nottingham, and so she graduated with a Bachelor of Theology (BTh) degree from Nottingham in 1973. She undertook postgraduate study at the University of Exeter and graduated with a Master of Arts (MA) degree in 1980. She then undertook postgraduate research at Keble College, Oxford, and graduated from the University of Oxford with a Doctor of Philosophy (DPhil) degree in 1987. Her doctoral thesis was titled "Personal piety in the study of the psalms: A reassessment".

Academic career
Gillingham specialises in the Hebrew Bible, the Book of Psalms, and Jewish history from the Israelites to the Second Temple. She has written a number of books about the Psalms and also two books about biblical studies.

In 1995, Gillingham was elected a Fellow and Tutor in theology at Worcester College, Oxford. On 1 October 1999, she was appointed a lecturer in theology at the University of Oxford. She was later promoted to Reader in Old Testament. In November 2014, she was awarded a Title of Distinction as Professor of the Hebrew Bible in the Faculty of Theology and Religion. She retired in 2019 and was granted the title of professor emeritus in the Faculty of Theology and Religion and became a senior research fellow at Worcester College.

Christian ministry
Gillingham is an active member of the Church of England. She began her ministry as a Licensed Lay Minister (also known as a reader). She was ordained to the permanent diaconate on 30 June 2018. She is attached to St Barnabas Church, Oxford, and Worcester College Chapel. Since October 2018, she has also served as canon theologian of Exeter Cathedral.

Honours
On 1 August 2015, Gillingham was awarded a Doctor of Divinity (DD) degree by the University of Oxford. The DD is Oxford's highest degree and she is the first British woman to have been awarded it. The work submitted for the degree has to "constitute an original contribution to the advancement of theological knowledge of such substance and distinction as to give the candidate an authoritative status in this branch of learning".

Selected works

References

Living people
English Anglican theologians
British biblical scholars
Old Testament scholars
Fellows of Worcester College, Oxford
Academics of the University of Oxford
Alumni of the University of Nottingham
Alumni of the University of Exeter
Alumni of St John's College, Nottingham
Lay theologians
Anglican biblical scholars
Anglican lay readers
Female biblical scholars
1951 births
Presidents of the Society for Old Testament Study